Frieda Lawrence (August 11, 1879 – August 11, 1956) was a German author and wife of the British novelist D.H. Lawrence.

Life

Emma Maria Frieda Johanna Freiin (Baroness) von Richthofen (also known under her married names as Frieda Weekley, Frieda Lawrence, and Frieda Lawrence Ravagli) was born into the German nobility at Metz. Her father was Baron Friedrich Ernst Emil Ludwig von Richthofen (1844–1916), an engineer in the Imperial German Army, and her mother was Anna Elise Lydia Marquier (1852–1930).

In 1899, she married a British philologist and professor of modern languages, Ernest Weekley, with whom she had three children, Charles Montague (born 1900), Elsa Agnès (born 1902) and Barbara Joy (born 1904). They settled in Nottingham, where Ernest was an academic at the university. During her marriage to Weekley she began to translate German literature, mainly fairy tales, into English.

She met D.H. Lawrence, a former student of her husband, in 1912; soon she fell in love with him, and they eloped to Germany. During their stay Lawrence was arrested for spying; after the intervention of Frieda's father, the couple walked south over the Alps to Italy. Following her divorce, Frieda and Lawrence married in 1914. She had been legally obliged to leave her children with Weekley; divorced adulterous women were unable to gain custody. Additionally, Hephzibah Anderson writes (11th December 2018) in a review of the Annabel Abbs novel "Frieda" regarding Lawrence: "He becomes jealous of her children, and as actually happened, writes to Weekley, telling him of their affair, setting in motion divorce proceedings that will strip her of her maternal rights, nearly destroying her."

While they had intended to return to the continent, the outbreak of war kept them in England, where they endured official harassment and censorship. They also struggled with limited resources and D.H. Lawrence's already frail health.

Leaving postwar England at the earliest opportunity, they traveled widely, eventually settling at the Kiowa Ranch near Taos, New Mexico, and in Lawrence's last years at the Villa Mirenda, near Scandicci in Tuscany. After her husband's death in Vence, France, in 1930, she returned to Taos to live with her third husband, Angelo Ravagli. The ranch is now owned by the University of New Mexico at Albuquerque.

Georgia O'Keeffe, who knew her in Taos, said in 1974: "Frieda was very special. I can remember very clearly the first time I ever saw her, standing in a doorway, with her hair all frizzed out, wearing a cheap red calico dress that looked as though she'd just wiped out the frying pan with it. She was not thin, and not young, but there was something radiant and wonderful about her."

Mainly through her elder sister Else von Richthofen, Frieda became acquainted with many intellectuals and authors, including the socioeconomist Alfred Weber and sociologist Max Weber, the radical psychoanalyst Otto Gross (who became her lover), and the writer Fanny zu Reventlow.

By her approval of the dramatization for the theatre of Lawrence's Lady Chatterley's Lover—thought to be based partly on her own relationship as an aristocrat with the working-class Lawrence—it became his only novel ever to be staged. John Harte's play was the only dramatization to be accepted by her, and she did her best to get it produced. Although she loved the play when she read it, the copyright to Lawrence's story had already been acquired by Baron Philippe de Rothschild, who was a close friend. He did not relinquish it until 1960, after his film version had been released. John Harte's play was first produced at The Arts Theatre, London in 1961, five years after her death.

Death

Frieda Lawrence died on her seventy-seventh birthday in Taos.

In popular culture
She is an important character in On the Rocks, a play by Amy Rosenthal which deals with her sometimes difficult relationship with D.H. Lawrence.

Lawrence was the inspiration for the character Harriet Somers, played by Judy Davis in the Australian film Kangaroo (1987). The film is based on D.H. Lawrence's semi-autobiographical novel of the same name.

Bibliography

Autobiography

Lawrence, Frieda von Richthofen. Not I, but the Wind... With an afterword by Harry T. Moore. New York: Viking, 1934.
Reprint. Carbondale: Southern Illinois University Press, 1974.  .

Biographies

 Byrne, Janet. A Genius for Living: The Life of Frieda Lawrence. New York: HarperCollins, 1995. .
 Crotch, Martha Gordon. Memories of Frieda Lawrence. Edinburgh: Tragara Press, 1975.  .
 Green, Martin. The von Richthofen Sisters: The Triumphant and the Tragic Modes of Love: Else and Frieda Von Richthofen, Otto Gross, Max Weber, and D.H. Lawrence, in the Years 1870–1970. New York: Basic Books, 1974. .
 Jackson, Rosie. Frieda Lawrence (Including Not I, But the Wind and other autobiographical writings). London and San Francisco: Pandora, an imprint of HarperCollins Publishers, 1994.
 Lawrence, Frieda von Richthofen, Harry T. Moore, and Dale B. Montague, eds. Frieda Lawrence and Her Circle: Letters from, to, and About Frieda Lawrence. London: Macmillan, 1981. .
 Tedlock, Jr., E. W., ed. Frieda Lawrence: The Memoirs and Correspondence. New York: Alfred A. Knopf, 1964.

References

External links

 

1879 births
1956 deaths
19th-century German women writers
20th-century German women writers
D. H. Lawrence
German baronesses
Lorraine-German people
Writers from Metz
People from Taos, New Mexico
Frieda von Richthofen